The 1904 Kentucky University Pioneers football team was an American football team that represented Kentucky University (now known as Transylvania University) as an independent during the 1904 college football season.

Schedule

References

Kentucky University
Transylvania Pioneers football seasons
Kentucky University Pioneers football